Caiza is a genus of harvestmen in the family Sclerosomatidae from South America.

Species
 Caiza argentina Ringuelet, 1959
 Caiza colliculosa Roewer, 1925

References

Harvestman genera